Shaista Zaid  is a former well known Pakistani English newscaster and radio presenter who worked for Pakistan Television and Radio Pakistan for almost four decades . In 1988, she received presidential Pride of Performance Awards for her brilliant work. She has also received Nigar award.

Early life
Shaista Zaid belonged to Rawalpindi, Punjab and joined PTV in 1969, after five years of the launching of the first State news channel.

Career
She worked there for almost 43 years and anchored evening English news on PTV till 2012. She has had a very successful and prestigious career as a TV newscaster. She is among a few who spent a life with Pakistan Television and served the institution for a long time. She retired after 43 of service on July, 20th 2012 as the most senior News Caster of Pakistan Television News.
She was also a teacher with a Master's degree in English Literature. Her reading style was so unique and beautiful and the delivery of words was so clear with a middle pitch of voice. During the early days, when English was not much-used language many people used to watch her bulletin without understanding the news. She earned huge respect and her name was synonymous with English news throughout Pakistan.

Awards and recognition
Pride of Performance Award in 1988 by the President of Pakistan. 
Nigar Award
At 9th PTV Awards she received best newscaster award in 1998

References

External links
  Shaista Zaid, The Face of PTV
 Newscaster Shaista Zaid
 Zaid on her last day

 

Pakistan Television Corporation people
Pakistani television newsreaders and news presenters
Nigar Award winners
Recipients of the Pride of Performance
Pakistani radio presenters
Pakistani women radio presenters
PTV Award winners